The Suzuki 50 GP racers were a series of 50cc racing motorcycles designed, developed, and built by Suzuki, to compete in the Grand Prix motorcycle racing world championship, between 1962 and 1968.

References

50 GP
Grand Prix motorcycles